is a one-shot Japanese manga written and illustrated by Youka Nitta. It is licensed in North America by 801 Media in January 2008.

Reception
Patricia Beard felt that Nitta's research into international diplomacy made the manga much more interesting, and she also enjoyed the atypical characterisation of Yoshinaga. Holly Ellingwood felt that the manga was Nitta's "best storytelling and artistry to date" Leroy Douresseaux praised Nitta's "attention to detail". In a poll at About.com, the manga was ranked fourth "Best New Boy's Love Manga" of 2008.

References

External links

Drama anime and manga
Josei manga
2006 manga
Yaoi anime and manga
Digital Manga Publishing titles